The 105th Division(() was created in October 1948 basing on defected Independent Brigade of 96th Reorganized Corps, Republic of China Army. 

The division was a part of PLA 35th Corps, under which command it took part in the 1949 battle of Nanjing.

In March 1950 the division was disbanded.

As of its disbandment the division was composed of:
313th Regiment;
314th Regiment;
315th Regiment.

References

中国人民解放军各步兵师沿革，http://blog.sina.com.cn/s/blog_a3f74a990101cp1q.html

Infantry divisions of the People's Liberation Army
Military units and formations established in 1948
Military units and formations disestablished in 1950